Rafael Porcellis de Oliveira (born 19 January 1987, in Porto Alegre) is a Brazilian professional footballer who plays as a striker for São José.

Club career
He is known for his striking abilities and has scored more than 80 goals in around 120 matches for SC Internacional youth teams, though he played only one game in the senior side. In July 2009, he signed for Helsingborgs IF.

In the summer of 2011, Porcellis was released by Helsingborgs IF. Following his release from the Swedish side, he went on trial with Portuguese first division side União de Leiria.  After several weeks on trial, União de Leiria decided not to sign him on a permanent basis. On 30 August 2011, he signed with Portuguese third division side Fátima.

In the summer of 2012, Porcellis left Fátima for Santa Clara after scoring 19 league goals in the 2011–12 season. Porcellis made his Santa Clara debut on 29 July 2012 in the inaugural group stage match of the 2012–13 Taça da Liga. The following week saw Porcellis score a hat-trick on his home ground debut against Trofense, in which his three goals helped his side seal a 5–0 victory. He followed up his hat-trick with two goals in the final League cup group stage match against Desportivo das Aves. Falcao made his Segunda Liga debut against Naval 1º de Maio on 12 August, where he managed to score a brace, which gave his side a 3–1 victory. His stay with the Ponta Delgada club would prove to be successful as he finished the 2012–13 season as the club's top goalscorer with 21 goals.

Prior to the end of the 2012–13 season, Primeira Liga side Braga announced that Porcellis would join the Arsenalistas on 1 July 2013. The arrival of Jesualdo Ferreira as manager, would see the arrival of forward players Edinho, Felipe Pardo, Hugo Vieira and Salvador Agra which would limit his playing time which resulted him being loaned out on a seasons long loan to second division side Feirense.

International career
Porcellis earned a call-up to the Brazilian under-18 side in 2005.

Statistics
Correct as of 1 April 2014

References

External links
 
 Profile at FootballTransfers

1987 births
Living people
Footballers from Porto Alegre
Brazilian footballers
Association football forwards
Brazil youth international footballers
Campeonato Brasileiro Série A players
Sport Club Internacional players
Campeonato Brasileiro Série B players
Santa Cruz Futebol Clube players
Grêmio Esportivo Brasil players
Campinense Clube players
Allsvenskan players
Helsingborgs IF players
Superettan players
IFK Värnamo players
Primeira Liga players
Liga Portugal 2 players
Segunda Divisão players
C.D. Fátima players
C.D. Santa Clara players
S.C. Braga players
C.D. Feirense players
C.F. União players
Leixões S.C. players
Al-Arabi SC (UAE) players
Brazilian expatriate footballers
Expatriate footballers in Sweden
Brazilian expatriate sportspeople in Sweden
Expatriate footballers in Poland
Expatriate footballers in Portugal
Brazilian expatriate sportspeople in Portugal
UAE First Division League players